Elbis (also Ilvis, Ilbis or Yilbis) is a deity of war and love in Yakut, Tuva and Altai mythology. Since "Elbis" shares some devilish characteristics, he became identified with Iblis under Islamic influences. However the name actually derives from the root "Yel" (or El/Al/Yal), which describes evil features.

If Elbis entered the heart of the enemy, it was believed to be inevitable to be defeated. Three days and three nights for the destruction of the enemy before the war, the shaman, asking for help from Elbis, puts him in the heart of the enemy.

In Yakut mythology, it is also the symbol of jealousy, enmity and ruthlessness.

References 

War gods
Love and lust gods
Yakut culture
Altai culture